Frida Öhrn (born 24 February 1979), raised in Solna, Sweden, is a Swedish singer and songwriter. She was the singer of Indie-pop band Oh Laura with the worldwide hit  "Release Me" in 2007 topping the charts in: Sweden, England, Poland, Australia, Ireland etc. after being used in a TV-Commercial for Saab Automobile.

She has also been a part of the Country trio band Cookies 'N' Beans, performing in the Swedish Melodifestivalen (Eurovision Song Contest qualifier) in 2009 with "What If" and in 2013 with "Burning Flags". She is also known for several well-received collaborations with a variety of Swedish musicians, where she performs mainly in Swedish, including the charting album Den lyckliges väg. With Bo Sundström. In 2016, she started her own record label Eaglebrain and released her first Solo material.

Discography

Singles

References

1979 births
Living people
Swedish pop singers
Swedish harmonica players
21st-century Swedish singers
21st-century Swedish women singers
English-language singers from Sweden
Melodifestivalen contestants of 2020
Melodifestivalen contestants of 2013
Melodifestivalen contestants of 2009
Melodifestivalen contestants of 2004